List of Guggenheim Fellowships awarded in 2013: Guggenheim Fellowships have been awarded annually since 1925, by the John Simon Guggenheim Memorial Foundation to those "who have demonstrated exceptional capacity for productive scholarship or exceptional creative ability in the arts."

References

2013
2013 awards
2013 art awards